In computing, delimited search refers to a simple search user interface allowing search in three steps: 
 First a user types a query string, 
 second the system computes the query on the whole body of searchable content, 
 third the user gets results (if they exist) for that query string from the system.  
This search mode is the default search system implemented in most operating systems, word processing systems, many online full-text search interfaces.

Incremental search 

The contrary of delimited search is incremental search in which a user gets instant feedback as he/she types a query based on what may exist in the content searched, thereby allowing him/her to adjust the query based on actual coverage of the target content instead of waiting for the system to compute results and possibly returning a "not found" error.

Critique 
The renowned interface design guru, Jef Raskin, defined delimited search  and compared it to his more favorite search interface (incremental search).  Here are his own words in his famous work, "The Human Interface":  "With a delimited search, the computer waits for the user to type a pattern and delimit it, after which it is the user who waits while the computer does the search.  When using a delimited search the user must guess, beforehand, how much of a pattern the computer needs to distinguish the desired target from other, similar targets.  With an incremental search, he can tell when he has typed enough to disambiguate the desired instance, because the target appeared on the display. (..) In spite of near agreement about the desirability of incremental searches on the part of both designers and users, almost all interface-building tools make it easy to implement delimited searches and difficult or impossible to implement incremental searches."

References

External links
If It Isn't Incremental, It's Excremental — Programming and Human Factors by Jeff Atwood.

User interface techniques